Manish Maheshwari is an Indian technology entrepreneur and executive. His technology ventures have focused on building solutions that improve the lives of the masses in emerging markets. He is Co-Founder of Fanory, a creator monetization platform, with majority investment from JetSynthesys and backed by the family offices of cricketing legend, Sachin Tendulkar, Serum Institute's Adar Poonawalla and Infosys co-founder, Kris Gopalakrishnan.

Maheshwari was the former head of Twitter India. Prior to Twitter, he was the CEO of Network18 Digital. He has also worked with Intuit, Flipkart, Procter & Gamble, and McKinsey. He also founded Invact Metaversity to bridge COVID-induced digital divide in education by leveraging the Metaverse technology.

Maheshwari was elected to the Governing Council of the Internet and Mobile Association of India (IAMAI) in 2017. He additionally served on the Executive Council until 2019 as a Treasurer, a role of significant national responsibility.

Early in his career, he, along with Intuit's founder, Scott Cook and Intuit engineers Manish Shah and Clinton Nielsen, co-founded txtWeb. txtWeb was an emerging markets-focused mobile platform for citizen journalism, for which the founders hold a patent issued by United States Patent & Trademark Office. txtWeb was recognised by GSMA as a global case study on empowerment through access to information. Snap's founder, Evan Spiegel, briefly worked as an intern on the txtWeb team. India Today magazine recognised Maheshwari as one of India's Top 10 Innovators in 2014.

After earning an MBA with honours from the Wharton School at the University of Pennsylvania, supported by a Ford Research Fellowship, Maheshwari briefly worked as a consultant with McKinsey & Company, where he advised the Government of India on higher education system reforms.

Maheshwari is a TEDx speaker, an active MENSA member, and a PADI-certified diver who speaks five languages.

Early life and education

When he was an infant, his family migrated to Nepal in search of economic opportunities. He completed his primary schooling in a local Nepali school in Biratnagar and later attended Modern India School in Kathmandu. In the year 1990, when he was 13 years old, there was a political upheaval in Nepal. The reigning monarch King Birendra, lifted the ban on pro-democracy political parties after more than a year of nationwide protests. This ultimately paved the way for establishing a multi-party democracy in Nepal. However, since his family was not ethnically Nepalese and had no voting rights, they had to leave Nepal. He completed the rest of his schooling on scholarship at Maheshwari Public School, a community-run school in Jaipur.  
 
For his undergraduate education, he went to Shri Ram College Commerce at the University of Delhi. There, he served as editor for the college magazine. He won the student body elections and served as the president of the History & Political Science Society. He has also won the Principal Madan Mohan Medal.

In 2004, the Wharton School at the University of Pennsylvania accepted him into the two-year full-time MBA program. There he was elected Co-President of the Asia Club, one of the largest student-run clubs on campus.  During the summer break, he volunteered in East Timor under Wharton International Volunteer Program. East Timor had recently gained independence in 2002, and the task that lay ahead was that of nation-building. There he worked with executives of international organisations such as the United Nations (UN), The United States Agency for International Development (USAID), the Japan International Cooperation Agency (JICA), and local government bodies. He graduated with honours while also winning the Shils-Zeidman Award, the highest award for entrepreneurship at Wharton.

Career
Maheshwari began his career in 1999 with Procter & Gamble (P&G) in Mumbai where he worked on the business of Vicks brand. After a year, he was promoted and sent from India to Asia-Pacific regional headquarters.

At McKinsey & Company in New York, United States, he advised Fortune 500 companies on new market entry and growth strategies for emerging markets. He then moved to the Bay Area and joined Intuit, a consumer software company headquartered in Mountain View, California. There he worked with Intuit's founder, Scott Cook and Intuit engineers, Manish Shah and Clinton Nielsen to explore a text-based mobile platform for news and information. In 2011, he, along with Scott Cook, Manish Shah and Clinton Nielsen, co-founded txtWeb, an app development platform. Snap's founder, Evan Spiegel, briefly worked as an intern on the txtWeb team.

At its peak, txtWeb had over 11 million users using one or more of the 3500 active apps built by developers and businesses across India. It grew to 1 billion transactions by 2014. It was recognised by GSMA as a global case study on empowerment through access to information. It helped voters make an informed decision in the Indian general election in 2014.

txtWeb went on to bag many innovation awards. Notable among them were mBillionth Award South Asia and NASSCOM Innovation Award Runner-up in 2013. India Today magazine recognised Maheshwari as one of India's top 10 innovators in the year 2014.

Maheshwari was then hired by Flipkart to set up and grow Seller Ecosystem for Flipkart's marketplace. Under him, between February 2015 and February 2016, Flipkart's seller base grew tenfold. He worked on making selling online a mass movement in India by training sellers in areas such as the functioning of the market place, cataloging, order management, promotion of products and providing quality service to customers. He started initiatives such as ‘Flipkart Seller Campus’ and ‘Flipkart Helping Hands’ to empower and prepare small sellers during the peak festive demand season by creating a pool of trained manpower across the country who can be deployed under the plug-and-play model. He also pioneered global brand licensing for Indian sellers.

In April 2016, Maheshwari joined as the CEO of Network18 Digital to grow its online offerings which included Moneycontrol.com, Firstpost.com, News18.com, CricketNext.com, CNBC-TV18.com, Yatra.com, Homeshop18.com and BookMyShow.com. He pushed the group beyond just web to encompass a gamut of digital services enabled by mobile, machine learning, programmatic ad buying, Augmented reality (AR), and Virtual reality (VR). The group became the most visited and viewed media network on Youtube as per Vidooly's News Network Report for September to November 2017. Moneycontrol also launched India's first smartwatch application to have voice search for stocks enabled on the Apple watch. Maheshwari is credited with the regional expansion of the group through growth in 13 Indian languages resulting in a three-digit increase in traffic across platforms with corresponding growth in revenues. He pioneered a subscription model for Moneycontrol wherein subscribers paid a small premium for business research and stock reports. In two years after his joining, the company crossed the threshold of 100 million unique digital visitors per month with well-diversified revenues encompassing advertising, subscription, branded content, and syndications.

In April 2019, Maheshwari joined as the head of Twitter's India business to oversee Twitter India's teams in Delhi, Mumbai, and Bengaluru. He worked with a cross-functional team amidst COVID-19-related operational challenges. When the coronavirus pandemic ravaged India, Twitter became the virtual helpline to organise and manage relief operations across the country. He pushed for localising the product for India and adding a preferred Indian language option on the platform, which helped algorithms surface content in that language to the user. Non-English tweets in India grew to 50% of overall tweets. India became one of the fastest-growing audience markets for Twitter globally and saw its fastest revenue growth in India in five years. In August 2021, Maheshwari was promoted and relocated to Twitter's San Francisco headquarters as Senior Director for Revenue Strategy and Operations, focusing on new markets worldwide.

In December 2021, Maheshwari announced his intention to leave Twitter and launch an EdTech startup. In January 2022, he left Twitter and founded Invact Metaversity, a startup at the intersection of education and the metaverse. In May 2022, he exited the startup to take a break and pursue new opportunities.

Following the acquisition of Twitter by Elon Musk in 2022, Maheshwari has been vocal about his concerns with respect to significant layoffs in India, change in verification policy, and its detrimental impact on the two-sided network effect, which made Twitter influential in India. He is an expert commentator on latest developments in the area of digital technology, digital content and social media. His articles are featured in leading publications and he is invited for interviews and panel discussions on technology trends by top media outlets such as CNBC, The Indian Express and The Economic Times.

In early 2023, Maheshwari came out of stealth mode with a creator monetization platform, called Fanory, which he co-founded. Fanory received a majority investment from JetSynthesys and was backed by the family offices of cricketing legend, Sachin Tendulkar, Serum Institute of India's Adar Poonawalla and Infosys Co-Founder, Kris Gopalakrishnan. As part of the investment transaction, Maheshwari was appointed President of JetSynthesys.

Elected positions held

 President, History & Political Science Society, Shri Ram College of Commerce, University of Delhi, 1996
 Co-President, Wharton Asia Club, 2005
 Governing Council, Internet and Mobile Association of India, 2017–19
 Executive Council, Internet and Mobile Association of India, 2017–19

Awards and recognition
 Principal Madan Mohan Medal at Shri Ram College of Commerce
 Shils-Zeidman Award, the highest award for Entrepreneurship at the Wharton School

References

Living people
20th-century Indian businesspeople
Place of birth missing (living people)
Indian company founders
Wharton School of the University of Pennsylvania alumni
1977 births